Air Chief Marshal Mujahid Anwar Khan (Urdu: مجاہد انور خان) , is a retired senior officer and the former 15th Chief of Air Staff of the Pakistan Air Force. On 19 March 2018, ACM Anwar took over command of the Pakistan Air Force from his predecessor ACM Sohail Aman.

Born in a Punjabi Rajput Sulehria Family originally from Zafarwal. Khan was commissioned in GD (P) Branch of PAF in December 1983. During his illustrious career, he commanded a fighter squadron, a flying wing, two operational air bases PAF Base Shahbaz and PAF Base Mushaf and a regional air command.

He is a graduate of Combat Commanders' School, Command and Staff College, Jordan and National Defence University, Islamabad.

Air Marshal Mujahid Anwar Khan holds a master's degree in War Studies and Defence Management. He is also a recipient of Tamgha-e-Imtiaz (Military) and Sitara-e-Imtiaz (Military).

 

In his previous appointments, he has also served as Personal Staff Officer to Chief of the Air Staff, Assistant Chief of the Air Staff (Operations), Deputy Chief of the Air Staff (Operations), Director General C4I, Deputy Chief of the Air Staff (Support) and Director General Air Force Strategic Command at Air Headquarters, Islamabad. The Air Chief has flown various training and fighter aircraft including F-16, F-6, FT-5, T-37 and MFI-17 Mushhak. In recognition of his meritorious services, he has been awarded Hilal-e-Imtiaz (Military), Sitara-e-Imtiaz (Military), Tamgha-e-Imtiaz (Military), Nishan-e-Imtiaz (Military), Nishan-e-Imtiaz (Civilian), and Turkish Legion of Merit.

Awards and decorations

Foreign Decorations

Effective dates of promotion

References

External links 
 

Chiefs of Air Staff, Pakistan
Pakistan Air Force air marshals
1962 births
Living people